The Canadian Professional Championship was a professional snooker tournament which was open only for Canadian players.

History
The championship was first played unofficially in 1974 with Cliff Thorburn winning the title.

The first official Canadian tournament was played in 1983 when the WPBSA offered a subsidy of £1,000 per player to any country holding a professional national championship. Like other similar tournaments in Australia and South Africa, it was discontinued when WPBSA funding was withdrawn after the 1988/89 season.

Winners

References

Canadian Professional Championship
Snooker non-ranking competitions
Defunct snooker competitions